Haedropleura orientalis is an extinct species of sea snail, a marine gastropod mollusk in the family Horaiclavidae.

Description
The length of the shell attains 33.7 mm.

Distribution
This extinct species occurs in Paleocene strata of India; age range: 58.7 to 55.8 Ma

References

 E. Vredenburg. 1923. Indian Tertiary Gastropoda, No. 5, Fusidae, Turbinellidae, Chrysodomidae, Strepturidae, Buccinidae, Nassidae, Columbellidae, with a short diagnoses of new species by the late E. Vredenburg. Records of the Geological Survey of India 55(1):52-77
 R. P. Kachhara, K. Bigyapati Devi, and R. L. Joghawat. 2011. Molluscan Assemblage from the Marine Palaeocene Sequence in Southwestern Kachchh, Gujarat. Journal Gological Society of India 78:81–91

External links

orientalis